Karl Ouren (February 5, 1882 – January 3, 1943) was an American artist best known for his paintings of Norwegian landscapes and scenes, particularly those featuring winter and snow.

Background
Karl Peter Andreas Ouren was born in Halden, in Østfold county, Norway, the son of Markus Einar Andreas Ouren and Helga Petronelle Olsen Ouren. He studied art in Trondhjem and later at the Technical School (Københavns Tekniske Skole)  in Copenhagen, Denmark. He emigrated to the United States in 1902, settling in Chicago, Illinois. He attended the School of the Art Institute of Chicago from 1911-1914 under the instruction of Antonin Sterba (1875-1963).

Career
He exhibited frequently at the Palette and Chisel Academy of Fine Art where he was a member and where he also studied. He was awarded a gold medal from the Palette and Chisel Club in 1919. His work was featured at the Chicago Gallery Association and at the Art Institute of Chicago.   Paintings by Ouren were included in the Norse-American Centennial  Art Exhibition held at the Minnesota State Fair in 1925. He received prizes from the Chicago Galleries Association in 1929 and 1930. His paintings were also part of the permanent collection at the Chicago Norske Klub where he won special prizes in 1924 and 1929.

Personal life
In 1915 he married Karen Stubban of Orkdal in Sør-Trøndelag county, Norway He became a naturalized United States citizen in 1927. He died in 1943 in Chicago. He is survived by his daughter Helen (Ouren) Ingebrigtsen, 3 grandchildren, 5 great grandchildren and 7 great-great grandchildren.

References

Other sources
Haugan, Reidar Rye (1933) Prominent Artists and Exhibits of Their Work in Chicago (Chicago Norske Klub. Nordmanns-Forbundet, 24: 371—374,Volume 7) 
Lovoll, Odd S. (1988) A Century of Urban Life: the Norwegians in Chicago before 1930 (Northfield, MN: Norwegian-American Historical Association, 
Strand, A.E. (1905) A History of the Norwegians of Illinois (Chicago, IL: John Anderson Publishing Co.)

External links
 Winter in Svolvoer Harbour  by Karl Ouren, 1930

1882 births
1943 deaths
People from Halden
20th-century American painters
American male painters
Artists from Chicago
Norwegian emigrants to the United States
School of the Art Institute of Chicago alumni
20th-century American male artists